Gastrotheca antoniiochoai is a species of frog in the family Hemiphractidae. It is endemic to Peru and only known from near its type locality near the Wayqecha Biological Station (Cusco Region). It appears to be an arboreal species living in bromeliads. The species occurs in the Manú National Park and does not face significant threats.

References

antoniiochoai
Amphibians of the Andes
Amphibians of Peru
Endemic fauna of Peru
Amphibians described in 2005